Farah may refer to:

 Farah (name)
 Farah (actress) (born 1966), Indian actress
 Farah, Afghanistan, a city in western Afghanistan on the Farah River
 Farah, India, a town in Uttar Pradesh, India
 Farah Province, Afghanistan
 Farah River, a river in western Afghanistan

See also
Farha
Fara (disambiguation)
Farra (disambiguation)